Andrei Belevich (born 27 August 1997) is a Belarusian ice hockey player for Torpedo Nizhny Novgorod and the Belarusian national team.

He represented Belarus at the 2021 IIHF World Championship.

References

External links

1997 births
Living people
Belarusian expatriate ice hockey people
Belarusian expatriate sportspeople in Russia
Belarusian ice hockey centres
Expatriate ice hockey players in Russia
Sportspeople from Grodno
Torpedo Nizhny Novgorod players
Yunost Minsk players